Tarinain lähde is a 1974 poetry collection by Finnish poet and translator Aale Tynni.

1974 poetry books
Finnish poetry collections